Evelyn Verdin Goshawk (19 March 1916 – 25 October 1994) was a Canadian track and field athlete who competed in the long jump event.

Biography

Life 
Evelyn Goshawk was born in Winnipeg, Manitoba on 19 March 1916 to George Edward Goshawk and May Evelyn Verdin, both of whom were English immigrants. She married Alfred LeFevre in 1939, and died in Burnaby, British Columbia on 25 October 1994.

Career 
Goshawk participated in women's long jump in the British Empire Games (now Commonwealth Games) in 1934, where she earned a silver medal, with Phyllis Bartholomew taking the gold. In 1938, she came fourth, behind Decima Norman, Ethel May Raby, and Thelma Peake. She was the first Manitoban woman to compete for Canada in any international sporting competition.

See also 

 Athletics at the 1934 British Empire Games – Women's long jump
 Athletics at the 1938 British Empire Games – Women's long jump
 List of Commonwealth Games medallists in athletics (women)

References 

1916 births
1994 deaths
Athletes (track and field) at the 1934 British Empire Games
Athletes (track and field) at the 1938 British Empire Games
Canadian female long jumpers
Athletes from Winnipeg
Canadian people of English descent
Commonwealth Games silver medallists for Canada
Commonwealth Games medallists in athletics
Medallists at the 1934 British Empire Games